The  New York Giants season was the franchise's 23rd season in the National Football League.

NFL Draft

Schedule

Standings

See also
List of New York Giants seasons

References

New York Giants seasons
New York Giants
1947 in sports in New York City
1940s in Manhattan
Washington Heights, Manhattan